Guy Leclerc (born 5 October 1955) is a Canadian water polo player. He competed at the 1972 Summer Olympics and the 1976 Summer Olympics.

See also
 Canada men's Olympic water polo team records and statistics
 List of men's Olympic water polo tournament goalkeepers

References

External links
 

1955 births
Living people
Canadian male water polo players
Water polo goalkeepers
Olympic water polo players of Canada
Water polo players at the 1972 Summer Olympics
Water polo players at the 1976 Summer Olympics
Water polo players from Montreal